Arhopala argentea, is a butterfly in the family Lycaenidae. It was described by Otto Staudinger in 1888. It is found in the Indomalayan realm where it is found in Celebes and the Philippines.

Subspecies

A. a. argentea Celebes
A. a. boordi Tennent & Rawlins, 2010
A. a. verityae Tennent & Rawlins, 2010

References

External links
Arhopala Boisduval, 1832 at Markku Savela's Lepidoptera and Some Other Life Forms. Retrieved June 3, 2017.

Arhopala
Butterflies described in 1888